Carbon Canyon Regional Park (or simply Carbon Canyon Park) is a regional park in Brea, California, that was created after the Carbon Canyon Creek was dammed. It links up with Chino Hills State Park on the east side. The park also is home to a small forest of Redwood trees, which have been struggling to survive since the start of the 2010 California drought.

History 
The park area used to be the town of Olinda just before the 1880s. Whi a dam on Carbon Canyon Creek was built to prevent flooding, the area became a park.

The lake in the center of the park was rebuilt in 2014 due to reduced water quality and capacity, which resulted in OC Parks not being able to stock the lake with fish.

Demolition of the existing lake began on July 14, 2014. The lake had to be drained completely in order for heavy equipment to be used to remove approximately 9,500 cubic yards of silt. The silt had accumulated under the lake over the course of 17 years from runoff and wildfires. Removal of the silt was started in August 2014.

Removal was completed in October 2014 and the process of refilling the lake started. Fish were stocked approximately a month after the refilling was completed.

Redwood forest 
A  of Coastal Sequoia redwood trees reside within the park's boundaries and is host to various species of birds, rabbits, squirrels, chipmunks and fauna. The forest was threatened in 2008 by the Triangle Fire and by the California drought from 2010 to 2016.

The staff at Carbon Canyon Park have met with specialists from UC Irvine and Disneyland in order to put a new system in place that will sustain the forest through the current drought. Despite these efforts, one tree was cut down in 2015 due to it being sick and near death.

Facilities 
Carbon Canyon Regional Park has the following facilities:

 Cross Country course (Cal State Fullerton)
 Tennis courts
 Volleyball courts
 Playgrounds
 Man-made lake
 Fishing platforms
 Restrooms
 Outdoor shelters
 Nature, horse, hiking trails

The park is used by people who want to have picnics or to celebrate holidays. The hiking trail to the Redwood forest also attracts hikers. It is also a frequent training and competitive area for various cross country teams.

Fire fighting 

The lake in the park is often used to fill fire fighting helicopters when responding to fires in the area.

The most notable use like this was during the Triangle Fire in 2008. The fire was threatening the eastern side of the city of Brea; including the Hollydale, Olinda Village, and Olinda Ranch communities, alongside Carbon Canyon Regional Park.

References 

Brea, California
Parks in Orange County, California
College cross country courses in the United States
Cross country running courses in California
Cal State Fullerton Titans cross country